Moussa Maaskri (born 15 November 1962) is an Algerian-born French actor. He appeared in more than 70 films since 1990.

Selected filmography

References

External links 

1962 births
People from Constantine, Algeria
Living people
French male film actors
Algerian male film actors
20th-century French male actors
21st-century French male actors
French male television actors
French male stage actors
21st-century Algerian people